Bhajarangi is a 2013 Indian Kannada-language fantasy action film starring Shiva Rajkumar and Aindrita Ray. Directed by choreographer-turned-director Harsha, the film was released on 12 December 2013 and received positive response from critics. Bhajarangi was the highest-grossing Kannada film of 2013. The film was declared a blockbuster at the box office.

Plot
The story takes place in a hamlet called Ramadurga. A tantrik terrorises the villagers bylooting their valuables, raping women and killing them. Jeeva comes to Ramadurga to discover his "Janma rahasya" (mystery of his birth). To his shock, he learns that he is the grandson of Bhajarangi who battled the tantrik and saved the villagers from his harassment. But the sly tantrik impeded Bhajarangi by creating a demon in the form of a baby and made Bhajarangi believe that he is his son. Jeeva eventually defeats the tantrik.

Cast

 Shiva Rajkumar as Bhajarangi / Jeeva
 Aindrita Ray as Geetha
 Rukmini Vijayakumar as Krishne (voice dubbed by Harini Shrikanth)
 Madhu Guruswamy as Tantrik /Mantravadhi
 Saurav Lokesh as Raana/Raktaksha
 Sadhu Kokila
 Bullet Prakash as James Bond
 Tabla Nani
 Girija Lokesh
 Rani Damukumar
 Jyothi Murur
 Harini Shrikanth
 Venkatesh Prasad
 Mahesh
 Shivaram
 Michael Madhu
 K. S. Sridhar
 Chethan
 Vidya Rao
 Vijayanand
 Bhajarangi Mohan
 Vaijanath Biradar
 Shruthi R 
 Honnavalli Krishna
 Tumkur Mohan
 Laya Kokila
 Kaddipudi Chandru

The film's introductory song "Bossu Nam Bossu" features special appearances by the following actors:
 Vijay Raghavendra
 Sriimurali
 Aditya
 Srinagar Kitty
 Yogesh
 Sathish Ninasam
 Arjun Janya
 R. Nataraaj Gowda

Production
Actor Shiva Rajkumar had to lose weight for the film and prepared for a six-pack body at the age of 51. Much of the movie was shot near Hesarghatta, which is northwest of Bengaluru.

The official trailer of the movie was launched in Triveni theatre Bangalore in September 2013  which was attended by Yash. The introductory song, featuring six leading actors of Kannada cinema, was shot at Minerva Mills, Bangalore.

Release
The film's producers Nataraj Gowda and Manjunath Gowda have teamed up with PVR Cinemas for the film's domestic release. The film was released simultaneously on 12 December 2013 in Karnataka, Maharashtra, Andhra Pradesh and Tamil Nadu in multiple theaters. The producers have reportedly booked more than 221 cinema halls across the Karnataka state alone.

Soundtrack

Critical reception

A critic from The Times of India scored the film at 4 out of 5 stars and says "Shivarajkumar has combined all his experiences to give a brilliant performance. Be it action, sentiment or romance, Shivanna is at his best. Aindrita Ray too is at her best throughout, especially in the climax. Music by Arjun Janya is apt for the story and quite remarkable. Lokesh shines as a villain. Jai Anand is simply superb in his camerawork". A critic from Sify.com wrote "Songs by Arjun Janya highlights the music and the picturisation of songs have been captured beautifully in the camera handled by Jai Anand. Harsha has definitely made his mark as a director and he is here to stay for a very long time". A critic from Deccan Chronicle wrote "Now, the grandson of Bhajarangi returns to his roots and fights the baddies. A must-watch for Shivarajkumar fans and all those who'd love to escape reality, at least for few hours. Arjun Janya's music is another treat in the movie". Shyam Prasad S from Bangalore Mirror wrote  "Arjun Janya wins in his compositions which are spaced out and do not interfere with the narrative. Bhajarangi is one of Shiva Rajkumar's best films in recent times".

Sequel 
A sequel, named Bhajarangi 2, featuring Shiva Rajkumar and Karthika Bhavana in the lead, Harsha as director and produced by Jayanna and Bhogendra, was released on 29 October 2021.

References

External links
 

2013 films
2010s Kannada-language films
Films scored by Arjun Janya
Indian fantasy action films
2013 masala films
Films about reincarnation
Indian films with live action and animation
Indian pregnancy films
Films set in Karnataka
Films directed by Harsha